The former V&D in Heerlen was an office building and former department store designed by Frits Peutz (best known for the Glaspaleis) in 1958 as part of the store chain Vroom & Dreesmann (located in Heerlen since 1920). The interior design was done by Mr. Kober and his daughter Marcia and the builders were E. Joosten and L. Reumkens. The director in Heerlen was Adrianus Merkx.

The building was relatively different for Heerlen, although used to modern architecture (Glaspaleis, former office Oranje Nassaumijnen, Monseigneur Schrijnen Retreat House etc.), this building as it looked more like a modern curtain wall skyscraper (10 storeys high). It has two entrances one on the Raadshuisplein and the other one the Geleenstraat, since the Geleenstraat is located lower the entrance there is 10 m under the Raadshuisplein level (which is also the case for the Town Hall, also designed by Peutz).

Situation on openings day
In this building 75,000 m  of electric wiring was used, with 2000 sockets and a 100,000 watt spear-power supply. There was one central telephone system with 380 connections, 120 cash registers, a Pneumatic post system, three elevators for shoppers and two high speed elevators, it also had three goods elevators.

There also were a loading and unloading dock for trucks and vans, 30 dishwashers that could clean and dry up to 9200 pieces of dishware per hour, Further it included seven Escalators, something unseen in Heerlen.

There was a tearoom and restaurant on the top floor, called the VenDorama.

In the early 1990s the building's facade was updated by a more contemporary postmodern design. After the renovation the building served as a municipal office building. It was demolished in 2019 to make room for a new municipal office building designed by Mecanoo.

References

Commercial buildings completed in 1958
VandD Heerlen
Buildings and structures in Heerlen